Moseley is an unincorporated area in Powhatan and Chesterfield counties in the U.S. state of Virginia. The United States Post Office for the community is located at 21431 Hull Street Road, with a ZIP code of 23120.  Many upper-middle class communities have been built in the area in previous years such as Foxcreek, Magnolia Green, Summer Lake, Westerleigh and FoxFire. It is bordered to the east by the census-designated place of Woodlake.

History
It was a stop on  the Farmville and Powhatan Railroad from 1891 to 1905, and then on the Tidewater and Western Railroad from 1905 to  1917.  It was also a stop on the Richmond and Danville Railroad, which became the Southern Railway (U.S.), and then the Norfolk Southern Railway in 1982, which no longer stops in Moseley.  In the 1800s some people would transfer between railroads here, although they had separate Stations.

In 1891 the train did not always stop, but a railroad car, although not a Railway post office, on the Farmville and Powhatan Railroad, dropped off and picked up mail using the Mail on-the-fly technique.  This was a hook and pouch system that let the train drop off and pick up mail without slowing.

References

External links
Chesterfield Berry Farm & Market website
Metro Richmond Zoo website

Unincorporated communities in Powhatan County, Virginia
Unincorporated communities in Chesterfield County, Virginia
Unincorporated communities in Virginia